Ceraticelus is a genus of dwarf spiders that was first described by Eugène Louis Simon in 1884.

Species
 it contains thirty-four species and two subspecies:
Ceraticelus agathus Chamberlin, 1949 – USA
Ceraticelus albus (Fox, 1891) – USA
Ceraticelus alticeps (Fox, 1891) – USA
Ceraticelus artemisiae Prentice & Redak, 2009 – USA
Ceraticelus atriceps (O. Pickard-Cambridge, 1874) – USA
Ceraticelus berthoudi Dondale, 1958 – USA
Ceraticelus bryantae Kaston, 1945 – USA
Ceraticelus bulbosus (Emerton, 1882) – North America, Netherlands, Germany, Poland, Finland, Russia (Europe to Far East)
Ceraticelus carinatus (Emerton, 1911) – USA
Ceraticelus crassiceps Chamberlin & Ivie, 1939 – USA
Ceraticelus creolus Chamberlin, 1925 – USA
Ceraticelus emertoni (O. Pickard-Cambridge, 1874) – USA
Ceraticelus fastidiosus Crosby & Bishop, 1925 – USA
Ceraticelus fissiceps (O. Pickard-Cambridge, 1874) (type) – USA, Canada
Ceraticelus innominabilis Crosby, 1905 – USA (Alaska)
Ceraticelus laetabilis (O. Pickard-Cambridge, 1874) – USA, Canada
Ceraticelus l. pisga Chamberlin, 1949 – USA
Ceraticelus laetus (O. Pickard-Cambridge, 1874) – USA, Canada
Ceraticelus laticeps (Emerton, 1894) – USA, Canada
Ceraticelus l. bucephalus Chamberlin & Ivie, 1944 – USA
Ceraticelus limnologicus Crosby & Bishop, 1925 – USA
Ceraticelus micropalpis (Emerton, 1882) – USA
Ceraticelus minutus (Emerton, 1882) – USA, Canada
Ceraticelus nigripes Bryant, 1940 – Cuba
Ceraticelus orientalis Eskov, 1987 – Russia
Ceraticelus paludigena Crosby & Bishop, 1925 – USA, Hispaniola
Ceraticelus paschalis Crosby & Bishop, 1925 – USA
Ceraticelus phylax Ivie & Barrows, 1935 – USA
Ceraticelus pygmaeus (Emerton, 1882) – USA
Ceraticelus rowensis [[Herbert Walter Levi|Levi]] & [[Herbert Walter Levi|Levi]], 1955 – Canada
Ceraticelus savannus Chamberlin & Ivie, 1944 – USA
Ceraticelus silus Dondale, 1958 – USA (Alaska)
Ceraticelus similis (Banks, 1892) – USA
Ceraticelus subniger Chamberlin, 1949 – USA
Ceraticelus tibialis (Fox, 1891) – USA
Ceraticelus tumidus Bryant, 1940 – Cuba

See also
 List of Linyphiidae species
Blacktailed red sheetweaver (spider with similar coloration)

References

Araneomorphae genera
Holarctic spiders
Linyphiidae
Spiders of North America
Spiders of the Caribbean